Hyloxalus is a genus of poison dart frogs, family Dendrobatidae. The genus is distributed in Central and South America, from Panama south to Peru (along the Pacific coast), along with Venezuela, Colombia, and Ecuador. They also inhabit the eastern foothills of the Andes in Bolivia to Venezuela, east to the upper Amazon Basin.

Description
Most species have cryptic, brown, gray, or black dorsal coloration, but some have conspicuous, bright colors (e.g., Hyloxalus azureiventris). A pale oblique lateral stripe is always present. Toe webbing is absent in most species but is present in some species and can even be extensive. Fingers bear narrow to moderately expanded discs.

Reproduction
Most species deposits their eggs in terrestrial nests and transport the tadpoles to pools on the forest floor or in backwaters of streams. Hyloxalus chlorocraspedus uses pools formed in fallen trees.

Species
As of early 2022, there are 63 recognized species:

References

 
Poison dart frogs
Amphibian genera
Amphibians of South America
Amphibians of Central America
Taxa named by Marcos Jiménez de la Espada